"Appetite for Destruction" is a song by American hip hop group N.W.A. The song is the second single from their final studio album Niggaz4Life. The song also appeared on The Best of N.W.A: The Strength of Street Knowledge. The music video featured members of N.W.A robbing a bank in a 1920s setting. After they rob the bank, the video returns to color and a modern setting. In the last scene, when the other members of N.W.A attempt to get away in a car, Eazy-E blows the car up killing the other members thus ending the song with the line, "Number 10 is my appetite to kill", referencing his version of the 10 Commandments in his verse. An extended version of the song for the music video also appeared on the home video Niggaz4Life: The Only Home Video released in 1992.

In popular culture

 The song is featured in the video game Grand Theft Auto V as part of the West Coast Classics radio station.

References

1991 singles
1991 songs
N.W.A songs
Gangsta rap songs
Songs written by MC Ren
Songs about police brutality
Songs written by The D.O.C.
Ruthless Records singles
Priority Records singles